Krzysztof Lipiński (born 14 July 1984) is a Polish luger who competed from 1999 to 2006. He finished 17th in the men's doubles event at the 2006 Winter Olympics in Turin.

Lipiński's best finish at the FIL World Luge Championships was 19th in the men's doubles event at Park City, Utah in 2005.

References
 2006 luge men's doubles results
 FIL-Luge profile

External links
 
 
 

1983 births
Living people
Lugers at the 2006 Winter Olympics
Polish male lugers
Olympic lugers of Poland
People from Poznań County
Sportspeople from Greater Poland Voivodeship